Jason Freeny (born 1970) is an American artist specializing in sculpture, designer toys and computer-generated imagery. He is the owner of the Moist Production studio, which acts as the primary publisher and distributor of his works. He is best known for his anatomical art, where he produces cutaway drawings and sculptures of (typically toy) inanimate objects such as a Lego man, Barbie doll, the animated fish Nemo or a balloon art dog.

Early life
Jason Freeny was born in 1970 in Silver Spring, Maryland, United States. Freeny studied Industrial Design at the Pratt Institute in  Brooklyn, New York. He attended Middletown High School in Middletown, Maryland.

Career
Before forming Moist Production LLC, Freeny worked for MTV as a freelance production and properties designer where he created the custom trophies used in the Rock'n'Jock series and TRL Awards televised events. Freeny also spent time at ESPN designing for the mobile division and was a freelance illustrator creating editorial and literary illustrations for Penthouse (magazine).

Freeny's sculptural and illustration work has been the basis for several mass-produced toys. He has collaborated with Hong Kong-based Toy2R (working on the Qee figurines), Hong Kong-based Fame Master toys producing Gummy bear anatomical toys, United States-based Jailbreak Collective producing the "CAPSL" collectable series and United States-based Marbles the Brain Store creating Freeny's Brain Cube puzzle.He has also worked with Singapore-based Mighty Jaxx to produce a series of Sanrio and Minions toy collectibles.

Awards
Freeny has received several Designer Toy Awards throughout his career, including Break Through Artist (2011), Fan Favorite (2013), Custom of the Year (2014), Best Collaboration with artist Luke Chueh (2014), Artist of the Year - Fan Choice (2014), and Best Vinyl & Plastic (2016).

Freeny was the Designer, Art Director and Typographer for the poster series entitled Anatomy, which was awarded the Grand Prix (Outdoor) and Gold Medal (Print Work) at the 2009 Dubai Lynx International Advertising Festival.

Private collections 
 Nike CEO/President Mark Parker
 Television Host Conan O'Brien
 Los Angeles collector Long Gone John
 Comedian Hamish Blake

Exhibitions 

Plastic Surgeon, Megumi Ogita Gallery, Tokyo, September 15 - October 5, 2017

MOLT, La Luz de Jesus, Los Angeles, CA. February 2015

PIQ, Piq, Las Vegas, NV. November 2013

101/exhibit, Los Angeles, CA. March 2013

Personal life
Jason lives in New York with his fiancée, Kendra.

References

External links
 Freeny's DeviantArt Gallery
 Moist Production Website
 Jason’s Instagram

1970 births
Living people
American sculptors
People from Silver Spring, Maryland
People from Middletown, Maryland
Balloon artists